Sir Ralph Bovey, 1st Baronet (died 11 October 1679), of Hillfields, Warwickshire, England was High Sheriff of Warwickshire and, later, Bedfordshire.

In 1633 he was admitted to Gray's Inn. He was an attorney of the Court of Common Pleas. He held the office of Sheriff of Warwickshire for 1652 and lived in Solihull, Warwickshire. He was High Sheriff of Bedfordshire in November 1668 and from 1669 to 1670 and lived in Long Stow, Cambridgeshire.

He was created a baronet, of Hillfields in the County of Warwick, on 30 August 1660. He died in 1679 without issue and was buried in linen at Long Stow. The title died with him. He had married the daughter of 1st Baron Maynard.

References

http://www.thepeerage.com/p17569.htm#i175683 thepeerage.com

1679 deaths
Baronets in the Baronetage of England
High Sheriffs of Warwickshire
High Sheriffs of Bedfordshire
Year of birth unknown
Sheriffs of Warwickshire